Jean-François Chaurin (born 23 October 1961) is a French former professional racing cyclist. He rode in two editions of the Tour de France.

References

External links
 

1961 births
Living people
French male cyclists
People from Savigny-sur-Orge
Sportspeople from Essonne
Cyclists from Île-de-France